Kritsada Nonchai (born February 2, 1989) is a Thai professional footballer who plays as a goalkeeper.

External links

Living people
1989 births
Kritsada Nonchai
Association football goalkeepers
Kritsada Nonchai
Kritsada Nonchai
Kritsada Nonchai